The 1934 Birmingham–Southern Panthers football team was an American football team that represented Birmingham–Southern College as a member of the Dixie Conference during the 1934 college football season. In Jenks Gillem's seventh season as head coach, the team compiled a record of 9–0 overall with a mark of 5–0 in conference play, winning the Dixie Conference title.

Schedule

References

Birmingham–Southern
Birmingham–Southern Panthers football seasons
College football undefeated seasons
Birmingham–Southern Panthers football